I Love You Baby may refer to:

 I Love You, Baby (2000 film), German action thriller film
 I Love You Baby (2001 film), Spanish romantic comedy film
 "I Luv U Baby", 1994 song by The Original
 "ILY (I Love You Baby)", 2019 song by Surf Mesa
 "I Love You, Baby", a song by Puff Daddy and Black Rob from the 1997 album No Way Out

See also 
 Baby I Love You (disambiguation)
 "I'd Like to Love You Baby", single by J.J. Cale from the album Okie
 "I love you baby", part of the lyrics of "Can't Take My Eyes Off You"